Olof Manfred "Olle" Möller (20 April 1906 – 22 March 1983) was a Swedish-American long-distance runner, who was also convicted for the 1939 murder of Gerd Johansson and the 1959 murder of Rut Lind.

Möller won about ten national titles in cross country running events between 1928 and 1939.

References

1906 births
1983 deaths
People convicted of murder by Sweden
Prisoners sentenced to life imprisonment by Sweden
Swedish male long-distance runners
Swedish murderers of children
Swedish people convicted of murder
American emigrants to Sweden